Bryan Adinany (born 13 March 2000) is a French professional footballer who plays as a forward for Serie D club Gozzano.

Career
Adinany is a youth product of Rennes. He joined Châteauroux in 2018, and made his professional debut with the club in a 2–1 Ligue 2 loss to Orléans on 13 February 2019.

In 2020, Adinany joined Italian club Gozzano.

References

External links
 
 Stade Rennais Profile

2000 births
Living people
Footballers from Marseille
French footballers
French sportspeople of Malagasy descent
Association football forwards
LB Châteauroux players
A.C. Gozzano players
Ligue 2 players
French expatriate footballers
French expatriate sportspeople in Italy
Expatriate footballers in Italy
Black French sportspeople